Naval Sports Complex is a multi-use stadium in Islamabad.  It is mostly used for football games and is the home of Pakistan Navy FC.  The stadium has the capacity to hold 1,000 people.

Football venues in Pakistan